Jeanne Corbin (March 1906 – 7 May 1944) was a communist activist and trade union organiser in Canada.

Corbin and her family emigrated from France to Canada in 1911. After landing in Newfoundland, the family made their way to a farm near Edmonton, Alberta.

In high school, she joined the Young Communist League of Canada. Later, she was a member of the Workers' Defense League. An active member of the Communist Party of Canada, she is considered a "Party heroine" of the CPC.

She died at the age of 38 due to tuberculosis.

References

1906 births
1944 deaths
Canadian women trade unionists
French emigrants to Canada
Members of the Communist Party of Canada
Trade unionists from Alberta